The Last One is a computer program released in 1981 by the British company D.J. "AI" Systems. Now obsolete, it took input from a user and generated an executable program in the BASIC computer language.

The software was a program generator, as distinct from an actual programming language, as programs were generated by the user selecting options from menus that would form the basis of the generated code. This was done in a logical sequence that would eventually cause a program to be generated in BASIC. At any time, the user could elect to view a flow chart showing the current progress of the program's design.

Example
An example of a program to sort the names in a Christmas Card list in alphabetical order:

1. OPEN FILE <XMASLIST>
2. SET POINTER TO START OF FILE
3. SORT FILE
4. INPUT FROM FILE
5. IF END OF FILE REACHED BRANCH TO 8
6. OUTPUT DATA
7. UNCONDITIONAL BRANCH TO 4
8. TERMINATE

References

Notes
 THE LAST ONE Trademark - Registration Number 1218969 - Serial Number 73318733 :: Justia Trademarks

BASIC interpreters